Brembo may refer to:

Brembo, a company based in Bergamo involved in the manufacturing of automotive brake systems

Brembo river, a river in Lombardy.